TEV may refer to:

 Transient Earth Voltage: a term for voltages appearing on the metal work of switchgear due to internal partial discharges
 TeV, or teraelectronvolt or trillion electron volt, a measure of energy
 Total Enterprise Value, a financial measure
 Total Economic Value, an economic measure 
 Tracked Electric Vehicles, an open source electric vehicle system proposed by the TEV Project
 Transparent Election Verification Software, open source software for auditing elections
 Tobacco etch virus, a plant pathogenic virus of the family Potyviridae
 Tobacco etch virus protease, an enzyme commonly used in biochemistry
 Today's English Version, a former name for the Good News Bible
 TEV, a ship prefix for Turbo-electric Vessel, usually with steam driven turbines.
 Thermal expansion valve, a refrigeration system component
 The IATA code designator for Teruel Airport

See also